Easy Living is an album by Italian jazz trumpeter and composer Enrico Rava recorded in 2003 and released on the ECM label.

Reception
The Allmusic review by Thom Jurek awarded the album 4½ stars stating "Easy Living is a relaxed, low-key affair that is nonetheless fully engaged and deceptive in its pastoral appearance... for all of its warmth and beauty, for all of its free-flowing interplay between the front line and the shimmering rhythms, this is as adventurous and poetic as jazz can be in the new century".

Track listing
All compositions by Enrico Rava except as indicated
 "Cromosomi" - 8:26 
 "Drops" - 2:28 
 "Sand" - 9:18 
 "Easy Living" (Ralph Rainger, Leo Robin) - 4:14 
 "Algir Dalbughi" - 6:36 
 "Blancasnow" - 2:35 
 "Traveling Night" - 7:12 
 "Hornette and the Drums Thing" - 7:10 
 "Rain" - 6:46 
Recorded at Artesuono Recording Studio in Italy in June 2003

Personnel
Enrico Rava - trumpet
Gianluca Petrella - trombone
Stefano Bollani - piano
Rosario Bonaccorso - bass
Roberto Gatto - drums

References

ECM Records albums
Enrico Rava albums
2004 albums
Albums produced by Manfred Eicher